Claire Robertson née Harris (25 August 1975 – 26 October 2017) was a para table tennis player who competed in international level events. She was a double European bronze medalist in the team events and she has competed at the 2002 Commonwealth Games and 2006 Commonwealth Games where she reached the quarterfinals in the women's EAD doubles with Sara Head. She also participated at the 2008 Summer Paralympics in the women's singles C4 where she didn't advance to the final rounds.

She was married to Scott Robertson who was also a para table tennis player and they were both coached by Stefan Trofan. She died suddenly of a short illness in Flintshire.

References

1975 births
2017 deaths
Paralympic table tennis players of Great Britain
Welsh female table tennis players
Table tennis players at the 2002 Commonwealth Games
Table tennis players at the 2006 Commonwealth Games
Table tennis players at the 2008 Summer Paralympics
Commonwealth Games competitors for Wales